Leptastrea is a genus of massive reef building stony corals known primarily from the Indo-Pacific. Although previously assigned to Faviidae, Budd et al. (2012) assigned it to Scleractinia incertae sedis based on phylogenetic results demonstrating the polyphyly of Faviidae.

Species
The World Register of Marine Species lists the following species:
Leptastrea aequalis Veron, 2000
Leptastrea bewickensis Veron, Pichon, and Best, 1977
Leptastrea bottae (Milne Edwards and Haime, 1849)
Leptastrea inaequalis Klunzinger, 1879
Leptastrea pruinosa Crossland, 1952
Leptastrea purpurea (Dana, 1846) - (Ocellated brain coral)
Leptastrea transversa Klunzinger, 1879

References

Taxa named by Henri Milne-Edwards
Taxa named by Jules Haime
Scleractinia genera